The 1978 UEFA Cup Final was a football match played on 26 April 1978 and 9 May 1978 between PSV Eindhoven of Netherlands and SEC Bastia of France. PSV won the tie 3–0 on aggregate, with a 3–0 victory at home following a goalless draw in Bastia.

Route to the final

Match details

First leg

Second leg

See also
Forza Bastia Documentary of game by Jacques Tati
PSV Eindhoven in European football
SC Bastia in European football

References
RSSSF

2
Uefa Cup Final 1978
Uefa Cup Final 1978
UEFA Cup Finals
Uefa Cup Final 1978
Uefa Cup Final 1978
Uefa Cup Final
Uefa Cup Final
UEFA Cup Final
UEFA Cup Final
Sports competitions in Eindhoven
20th century in Eindhoven